HMZ may refer to:
 Bedford County Airport, in Pennsylvania, United States
 Hmong Shua language, spoken in China
 Hydrometeorological Institute of Slovenia